Siddharth Chandrakar (born 23 February 1993) is an Indian cricketer. He made his first-class debut for Chhattisgarh in the 2017–18 Ranji Trophy on 1 November 2017.

References

External links
 

1993 births
Living people
Indian cricketers
Place of birth missing (living people)
Chhattisgarh cricketers